The Lord Howe golden whistler (Pachycephala pectoralis contempta), also known as the Lord Howe whistler or Lord Howe Island golden whistler, and locally as the “robin” or “yellow robin”, is a small bird in the whistler family, Pachycephalidae.  It is a subspecies of the Australian golden whistler that is endemic to Lord Howe Island in the Tasman Sea, part of New South Wales, Australia.

Taxonomy and systematics
The Lord Howe golden whistler was originally described as a separate species.

Description
Males are similar to those of the nominate subspecies, though with a broader yellow collar.  Females differ slightly in having their primary and secondary feathers distinctly washed with cinnamon-brown, a yellowish-grey belly and pale-yellow under-tail coverts.

Distribution and habitat
The whistler is restricted to Lord Howe Island, where it widely distributed through the native subtropical rainforest, as well as in remnant native vegetation on roadsides in settled areas.

Behaviour

Breeding
The whistler breeds from September to January.  It builds an open cup-shaped nest of palm fibres and vine tendrils, lined with grass, in which it lays a clutch of two eggs.

Feeding
The whistlers eat spiders, insects and insect larvae, foraging through tree branches as well as on the ground in leaf litter.

Status and conservation 
The population of the Lord Howe golden whistler has been estimated at about 2,000 breeding birds and stable.  It has been listed as vulnerable by the Australian Government because of its small distribution. It is not listed anymore.

Notes

References 
 EPBC Act: List of Threatened Fauna. DEWHA. Accessed 10 February 2010
 Garnett, Stephen T.; & Crowley, Gabriel M. (2000). The Action Plan for Australian Birds 2000. Environment Australia: Canberra. 
 Higgins, P.J.; & Peter, J.M. (eds). (2003). Handbook of Australian, New Zealand and Antarctic Birds.  Volume 6: Pardalotes to Shrike-thrushes. Oxford University Press: Melbourne.  
 Hindwood, K.A. (1940). Birds of Lord Howe Island. Emu 40: 1-86.
 Hutton, Ian. (1991). Birds of Lord Howe Island: Past and Present. Author: Lord Howe Island.
 Schodde, R.; & Mason, I.J. (1999). The Directory of Australian Birds: Passerines. CSIRO Publishing: Melbourne.

External links
 Threatened species of New South Wales: Lord Howe Island golden whistler

Birds of Lord Howe Island
Birds described in 1898
Pachycephala